‌The 2022 Asian Club League Handball Championship was the 24th edition of the championship scheduled to be held from 22 to 30 2022 at Hyderabad, India under the aegis of Asian Handball Federation. It wasbe the second time in history that the championship was organised by the Handball Federation of India. It also acted as the qualification tournament for the 2022 IHF Men's Super Globe, with top team from the championship directly qualifying for the event to be held in Dammam, Saudi Arabia.

Group A

Group B

Knockout stage

Bracket

5–8th place semifinals

Semifinals

Seventh place game

Fifth place game

Third place game

Final

Final standings

References

External links
 Tournament Website
 Tournament Website

Handball competitions in Asia
Asian Handball Championships
Asian Men's Club League Handball Championship, 2022
Asia
Asian Men's Club League Handball Championship
Asian Club League Handball
Asian Men's Club League Handball Championship
Handball in India